This is a  list of aircraft types operated by the Iranian Air Force, not including those operated by the Aerospace Force of the Islamic Revolutionary Guard Corps. This list also includes those operated by the air arm of the Iranian Army prior to the foundation of the Air Force as a separate service in August 1955.

In 2007, Iraq asked Iran to return some of the scores of Iraqi fighter plans that flew there ahead of the Persian Gulf War in 1991. And as of 2014, Iran was receptive to the demands and was working on refurbishing an unspecified number of jets. In late 2014, Iran gave some of the impounded former Iraqi military aircraft back to Iraq.

Combat types

Air superiority fighters

Multirole fighters

Ground attack

Future additions

Reconnaissance, patrol, and EW

Maritime Patrol

Transport/AWACS/Maritime patrol

Transport and utility

Trainers

Helicopters 
Iranian helicopters are originally in its Islamic Republic of Iran Army Aviation.

Other types
These types were also purchased by the Iranian government

 One Aero A.30 from Czechoslovakia in 1923
 One De Havilland DHC-4 Caribou in 1979

A number of other types have been in recent, or reported to be in, Iranian service.  Many remain in reserve storage or are operated by the Army or Navy.  Some recent types include:

Shabaviz 2-75 (Iranian origin, operated by the Army)
HESA Shahed 278
Shahed 285 (40+ operated by Iranian forces)
IAIO Toufan (40+ operated by IRIAA)
Mikoyan MiG-23 (formerly IQAF)
Mi-17(47 operated by the Iranian air force)
Shenyang J-6
Boeing 727 (Cargo/transport)
Hughes 300C

Iran has a number of UAVs and UCAVs, currently under operation of the Iranian Army Aviation.

See also 

 List of aircraft of the Aerospace Force of the Islamic Revolutionary Guard Corps
 List of equipment of the Islamic Republic of Iran Air Defense Force

References

Further reading 

Islamic Republic of Iran Air Force

Iranian Air Force
Iranian military-related lists